Frank Gill Slaughter (February 25, 1908 – May 17, 2001), pen-name Frank G. Slaughter, pseudonym C.V. Terry, was an American novelist and physician whose books sold more than 60 million copies. His novels drew on his own experience as a doctor and his interest in history and the Bible. Through his novels, he often introduced readers to new findings in medical research and new medical technologies.

Biography

Slaughter was born in Washington, D.C., the son of Stephen Lucious Slaughter and Sarah "Sallie" Nicholson Gill. When he was about five years old, his family moved to a farm near Berea, North Carolina, which is west of Oxford, North Carolina. He earned a bachelor's degree from Trinity College (now Duke University) at 17 and went to medical school at Johns Hopkins University in Baltimore, Maryland. He began writing fiction in 1935 while a physician at Riverside Hospital in Jacksonville, Florida, paying off a $60 typewriter at $5 a month. He rewrote the manuscript of That None Should Die, a semi-autobiographical story of a young doctor, six times before Doubleday accepted it.

Several of Slaughter's novels became films, including Sangaree, made into the 1953 film of that name starring Fernando Lamas; and Doctors' Wives, made into the 1971 film of the same name starring Dyan Cannon and Gene Hackman.

Other books by Slaughter include  The Purple Quest, Surgeon, U.S.A., Tomorrow's Miracle and The Scarlet Cord. Slaughter's last novel, Transplant, was published in 1987. Most of the novels credited under his C.V. Terry pseudonym were republished under his real name.

Slaughter died May 17, 2001 in Jacksonville, Florida.

William DuBois was a silent writer with Slaughter on 27 of Slaughter's historical novels.

Books

Fiction
That None Should Die (1941)
Spencer Brade M.D. (1942)
Battle Surgeon (1944)
Air Surgeon (1945)
A Touch of Glory (1945)
In a Dark Garden (1946)
The Golden Isle (1947)
Sangaree (1948)
The Divine Mistress (1949)
The Stubborn Heart (1950)
Fort Everglades (1951)
The Road to Bithynia  (1951)
East Side General (1952)
The Cross and The Crown (1953)
Storm Haven (1953)
The Galileans: The story of Mary Magdalene (1953)
The Song of Ruth (1954)
The Healer (1955)
Flight From Natchez (1955)
The Scarlet Cord: A novel of the woman of Jericho (1956)
The Warrior (1956)
Sword and Scalpel (1957)
The Mapmaker (1957)
Daybreak (1958)
The Crown and the Cross: The Life of Christ (1959)
Lorena (1959)
The Thorn Of Arimathea (1959)
The Land and the Promise: The Greatest Stories of the Bible Retold (1960)
Pilgrims in Paradise (1960)
The Curse of Jezebel (1961)
Epidemic! (1961)
David, Warrior and King (1962)
 Tomorrow's Miracle (1962)
Devil's Harvest (1963)
A Savage Place (1964)
Constantine, The Miracle of the Flaming Cross (1965)
The Purple Quest (1965)
Doctors' Wives (1967)
God's Warrior (1967)
The Sins of Herod  (1968)
Upon this Rock (1968)
Surgeon's Choice:  A Novel of Medicine Tomorrow (1969)
Countdown (1970)
Code Five (1971)
Convention M.D. (1972)
Women in White (1974)
The Stonewall Brigade (1975)
Devil's Gamble: A Novel of Demonology (1977)
Plague Ship (1977)
Gospel Fever (1980)
Doctors at Risk (1983)
No Greater Love (1985)
Transplant (1987)

As C. V. Terry (some later republished credited to Slaughter)
Buccaneer Surgeon (1954)
Darien Venture (1955)
Buccaneer Doctor (1955)
The Golden Ones (1957)
The Deadly Lady of Madagascar (1959)

Nonfiction
Immortal Magyar: Semmelweis, the Conqueror of Childbed Fever (1950)
The New Science of Surgery (1946)
Medicine for Moderns: The New Science of Psychosomatic Medicine (1947)

References

 
"Frank G. Slaughter, novelist and physician, dead", Associated Press, May 23, 2001.
"Frank Slaughter, Novelist Of Medicine, Is Dead at 93", Paul Lewis, New York Times, May 23, 2001.
Kevin M. McCarthy: The Book Lover's Guide to Florida: Authors, Books and Literary Sites. Pineapple Press Inc. 1992, p. 43-45,

External links
Slaughter at fantasticfiction.co.uk

20th-century American novelists
American male novelists
Physicians from Florida
Novelists from Florida
Writers from Washington, D.C.
Novelists from North Carolina
Duke University Trinity College of Arts and Sciences alumni
Johns Hopkins University alumni
1908 births
2001 deaths
People from Alexander County, North Carolina
Medical fiction writers
20th-century American male writers